From its incorporation in 1847, the municipal boundaries of Atlanta, Georgia, United States, were extended repeatedly from a small area around its railroad station to today's city covering .

Prior to 1954, Atlanta was divided into political divisions called wards. The number of wards were increased as the city grew.

List of annexations

Annexations by year

1847
City is incorporated — city limits are a  radius from the zero mile marker of the Western & Atlantic Railroad.

1854

The 1848 charter only specified election of six citywide councilmembers, but on January 9, 1854, an ordinance was adopted that divided the town into five wards and two councilmen from each ward would be elected to coincide with the completion of the first official city hall.
The next election with the new rules on January 15, 1855, decided those first Ward bosses who would serve with the short-term mayor, Allison Nelson.
The boundaries were as follows:

First (yellow): all land west of the W&A Railroad and Whitehall Street. This diverse ward had concentrations of industry and working-class people (such as railroad men) in the northern and western parts but the eastern section was home to some of Atlanta's wealthiest citizens, such as Richard Peters.

Second (red): land south of Georgia RR between Whitehall and McDonough. This wealthy section included the bulk of the town's wholesalers, warehouses, grocers and hotels. The residential areas included people like Dr. Joseph Thompson.

Third (green): land south of Georgia RR and east of McDonough. This ward included the new city hall, a number of mills along the railroad and the east many large estates including that of Lemuel P. Grant.

Fourth (blue): north of Georgia RR and east of Ivy. This ward had two of the roughest sections of town; the red-light district along Decatur Street (including Murrell's Row) and Slabtown but the northern part was home to mostly small farms.

Fifth (violet): west of Ivy and north of W&A Railroad. This ward contained the large homes along Peachtree Street and the southern part, Fairlie-Poplar was also largely residential with warehousing along the western part.

1866
On March 12, city limits expand to a one-and-a-half mile radius from Union Depot.

1871

During a huge boom of post-war building, two new wards were added from parts of the First, Fourth and Fifth to reflect the changing look of the city. 
Sixth Ward (aqua): established October 1871 as the half of the First Ward north of Hunter St (MLK). This division left the wealthy in the First ward and gave the working-class people to the north two councilmen of their own.
Seventh Ward (grey): established December 2, 1871, of parts of the Fourth and Fifth. Specifically from the "junction of Houston and Pryor streets, thence through lot nineteen, between blocks three, one and two, five and six, to the city limits; thence northerly along the city limits to Peachtree Street; thence south along Peachtree Street and Pryor Street to the beginning." And the Fourth was extended "from Ivy Street west to Pryor, and from Houston Street south to the railroad, and that Pryor Street shall be the line between the fourth and fifth wards, and Pryor and Peachtree streets between the fifth and seventh wards." This gave the red-light district to the Fourth and created a new Ward of mostly farmers and to the west, fine residences along Ivy and the east side of Peachtree.

1874

A new city charter was approved by Governor Smith on February 28, 1874, which reduced the number of wards back to five and created a bi-cameral council of two councilmen from each ward and a second body of three at-large aldermen was established.
Each year one of the aldermen would be up for election and during his last year in office would serve as president of the other body.
They acted separately on finances but together for all other business.

The new ward layout was as follows:
First Ward (yellow) was bounded by Western & Atlantic Railroad, Foundry St, south around the city limits to modern Peachtree Street
Second Ward (red) was bounded by the Georgia Railroad, Whitehall south to city limits then north-east to McDonough (Capital Ave) and up to the railroad
Third Ward (green) was bounded by Butler (Jesse Hill Dr) and McDonough Streets south to the city limits north-east to Georgia RR, then west to Butler
Fourth Ward (blue) from Pryor and tracks east on Georgia RR to city limits then north west to West Peachtree and south to origin.
Fifth Ward (purple) from Pryor and tracks north-east to Peachtree, then West Peachtree to city limits, south-west to Foundry and W&A RR and east to origin

1883

On November 5, 1883, a Sixth Ward (beige) was carved out of the Fourth and Fifth Wards.
Its boundaries started at Butler and the GRR (today's Grady Hospital) north to North Ave at Myrtle St, then up Myrtle to the city limit at 3rd St.
Follow the arc of the city limit to Williams, south to Cain (International) then James (Church) to Forsyth south to the tracks then east on the tracks to origin.
This separated the wealthy Peachtree corridor from the other parts of north Atlanta. (Garrett Vol II, p. 53–54)

1889
Expansion of city limits to one and three-quarters radius from union depot.

1894
When West End was annexed into the city in 1894, it became a new Seventh Ward.

1904
 annexed - the southern part of what is now Midtown was already within the 1889 limits, but in 1904 the city annexes most of the rest of what is now Midtown: this is an area bounded by the 1889 circular city limits on the south, and West Peachtree St. on the west, stretching north up to but not including Ansley Park (roughly 6th to 16th Streets), Piedmont Park, the remainder of Historic Midtown east to what is now the BeltLine. this includes a strip of what is now the Old Fourth Ward between the 1889 limits and the BeltLine.

1905
Further expansion of the city limits was part of a long effort.

In October 1897 Frank P. Rice drove a failed proposal to annex Pittsburgh, Reynoldstown, Bellwood, and what was then called "north Atlanta".

"North Atlanta" was defined at the time roughly as today's Midtown, Georgia Tech, and English Avenue:
 today's Midtown between Myrtle St. in the Midtown Historic District and Cherry St., now inside the Georgia Tech campus, as far north as 14th St (then called Wilson Ave.)
 most of what is now the Georgia Tech campus, south of what was then 5th Street
 the area west of Georgia Tech, south of Jefferson St., as far west as Ashby St. (now Lowery Blvd.), including today's English Avenue neighborhood

In 1902 a special committee made a new proposal to annex those areas as well as "Bonnie Brae", Copenhill, and the "St. Charles Avenue" area (in today's Virginia Highland). By then, "north Atlanta" was being referred to as "Peachtree".

In 1905, the Eighth Ward was added. An act of the Georgia General Assembly was enacted on August 3, 1904, which designated the area from then current city limits (at 6th St and West Peachtree), north to 15th St, then east to Piedmont Ave, then northeast to Southern Railway (basically follow Piedmont to the Ansley Park area), then southwardly along the railway the limits. The act also took part of the Sixth Ward north of North Ave. into the new Eighth Ward.

1909
On January 1, 1909, a Ninth Ward was formed out of just annexed Copenhill, part of Druid Hills, Edgewood, Reynoldstown and East Atlanta. Edgewood alone had had its own city government before the annexation.

1910

Annexations
Ansley Park and most of Sherwood Forest
Peachtree Street from 15h street north to Palisades Road in southern Buckhead
the area that is now the Georgia Tech campus that was not already part of the city, including the Hemphill Avenue neighborhood
Bankhead east of the Louisville and Nashville Railroad line
Remainder of English Avenue (northern part) that was not already part of the city
Washington Park
What is now Mozley Park, then called Battle Hill
Ashview Heights
remainder of today's West End (western part) that was not already part of the city
most of Westview

Annexation of  including the town of Oakland City and from the previous city limits south to the BeltLine: Adair Park, most of Pittsburgh, southern Summerhill, southern/eastern edges of Grant Park neighborhood.

Annexation of the blocks surrounding Brown Park (now Brownwood Park) in East Atlanta - Moreland east to Stokesland and Glenwood south to the current city limits.

New Tenth Ward
A new Tenth Ward was created. The eastern boundary was McDaniel Street. The southwestern boundary was Whitehall Street to the Central of Georgia Railroad, and from there along the railroad to a point just south of the BeltLine. From there, the boundary ran due west to a prolongation of Holderness Street south of the BeltLine, and from there southwest to the junction of Campbellton and Utoy roads. Then due east along the north boundary of Fort McPherson to the Central of Georgia Railroad. Then south along that railway line to a point between Osborne and Astor avenues, then east to Sylvan Road, then north to the BeltLine, then east to McDaniel Street.

This included:
New territory from the annexations including Oakland City
Territory from the Second Ward west of McDaniel Street
Territory from the Seventh Ward east of the Central of Georgia Railroad

1919
Eleventh Ward created from part of the Ninth Ward (area south of the Georgia railroad line) and from part of the Third Ward. The new ward corresponds to East Atlanta, Ormewood Park, and other adjacent areas.

1922
Kirkwood annexed
North part of Virginia-Highland and south part of Morningside/Lenox Park annexed
Ormewood Park annexed

1923
In June 1923 there was a failed movement to annex College Park, East Point, and Hapeville.

1928
East Lake annexed as the 12th ward. 
Chosewood Park annexed.

1929
A Thirteenth Ward was created as the section of the Ninth Ward north of St. Charles and east of the Belt Line to the west side of Briarcliff and north the corporate limits. (most of today's Virginia-Highland)

1937
On March 14, 1935, the legislature reduced the number of wards from 13 to 6 and the thirty-nine member city council is cut to eighteen members effective January 1, 1937. The wards were combined as such:
First: old 2nd & 3rd (south from Central RR to Grant Park)
Second: old 11th & 12th (southeast: Ormewood, East Atlanta and East Lake)
Third: old 1st, 5th & 6th (northwest from Central RR around to three blocks east of Peachtree)
Fourth: old 7th & 10th (from West End to Oakland City)
Fifth: old 4th & 8th (from Georgia RR up to Piedmont Park and Ansley west of the Belt Line)
Sixth: old 9th & 13th (everything east of the Belt Line and north of Georgia RR: Inman Park, Druid Hills, etc.)

1952

In 1951, after a failed 1947 referendum and two other failed attempts, the state legislature passed a "Plan of Improvement" by which on Jan. 1, 1952, the city annexed  in  Buckhead, Adams Park, Southwest Atlanta & Lakewood. This helped spread the burden of providing public services by adding to the base a large group of mostly more affluent residents. The annexation was viewed as a triumph of Mayor Hartsfield.

Atlanta would in the 1970s again try, but without success, to repeat the process by state legislation to annex what is now Sandy Springs to Atlanta.

1953
Annexation of Ben Hill, Greenbriar and other adjacent areas in far southwestern Atlanta.

1954
The ward system is ended. No longer a bicameral body, only a board of six aldermen with a Vice-Mayor serving as president of the board. All positions were elected citywide. (For post-ward setup, see Political structure of Atlanta).

Annexations since 1953
Since 1953, multiple small annexations (and deannexations) to the City of Atlanta have occurred, in two periods: 1954–1979 and 2003-2010. No annexations took place between 1979 and 2003.

Multiple small areas adjacent to southwestern Atlanta were annexed including Midwest Cascade, Cascade Glen, and the Horseshoe Community. Sandtown's 2007 petition for annexation was put on hold.

These annexations added a few thousand residents, and approximately three square miles, including areas mostly in the southwest of the city, but also small parcels in the east and north of the city.

Emory University and Centers for Disease Control annexation
In December 2017, the Atlanta City Council approved an annexation request by Emory University, the Centers for Disease Control, Children's Healthcare of Atlanta - Egleston Hospital, and other contiguous property owners in the Druid Hills neighborhood of DeKalb County. The annexation was effective January 1, 2018. In June 2017 the university leadership formally petitioned the City of Atlanta to annex it. To comply with the requirement that an annexed area be adjacent to the existing city limits, the university purchased a residence partially within the then-city limits. The city government also entered into a settlement with the DeKalb County government to settle a dispute, paving the way for the annexation.

Due to the taxable revenue involved, there was a dispute over whether the area would remain in the DeKalb County School District or transition to Atlanta Public Schools. In 2016 Emory University made a statement that "Annexation of Emory into the City of Atlanta will not change school districts, since neighboring communities like Druid Hills will still be self-determining regarding annexation." By 2017 the city agreed to include the annexed property in the boundaries of APS, a move decried by the leadership of DeKalb County Schools as it would take taxable property away from that district. In 2017 the number of children living in the annexed territory who attended public schools was nine. The annexed area ultimately went to APS, and as part of a 2019 settlement Emory would help establish school-based clinics for DeKalb schools. Students in the area will be rezoned to APS effective 2024; they will be zoned to DeKalb schools before then.

References
 
City Council history
Stone, Clarence N., Regime Politics Governing Atlanta: 1946–1988, 1989, University Press of Kansas

External links
Detailed map of Atlanta annexations by City of Atlanta at Georgia State Library digital collections
Annexation Map of Atlanta from the 1980s
Property map of Emory University in 2017, attached to a press release from the university about its formally asking Atlanta to annex it

Maps showing annexation of CDC/Emory University area:
  - Indicates the university in the city limits of Atlanta
 In comparison:  - Page 6 shows the area of the university as being in the Druid Hills CDP. Detail of Druid Hills CDP

Notes

Ward System
Government of Atlanta
Geography of Atlanta